This is a list of animated television series scheduled to air, or that were first aired in 2023.

References

2023
2023
Television series
Animated series
2023-related lists